The 2014–15 Western Carolina Catamounts men's basketball team represented Western Carolina University during the 2014–15 NCAA Division I men's basketball season. The Catamounts, led by thenth year head coach Larry Hunter, played their home games at the Ramsey Center and were members of the Southern Conference. They finished the season 15–17, 9–9 in SoCon play to finish in fourth place. They advanced to the semifinals of the SoCon tournament to Wofford.

Roster

Schedule

|-
!colspan=9 style="background:#592c87; color:#c0a878;"|  Regular season

|-
!colspan=9 style="background:#592c87; color:#c0a878;"|   SoCon tournament

References

Western Carolina Catamounts men's basketball seasons
Western Carolina
West
West